The 2019 FIBA Americas League was the 12th edition of the top-tier level intercontinental professional club basketball competition in the Americas and last for the FIBA Americas League. Sixteen teams from across the Americas competed over three rounds, to determine the champion.

San Lorenzo won its second continental title, giving them the right to play in the 2020 FIBA Intercontinental Cup.

Team allocation

Teams

The labels in the parentheses show how each team qualified for the place of its starting round:
1st, 2nd, etc.: League position after Playoffs
TH: Americas League title holders
LSC: Liga Sudamericana winners
WC: Qualified through Wild Card

Notes

Group phase
Sixteen teams participated in the group phase, in which each team faced the other teams in the group once. Each group tournament was held at the arena of a host team. The two highest-placed teams in each group advance to the semifinal phase. Games were played from 18 January until 10 February 2019.

Group A
Venue: São Paulo, Brazil

Group B
Venue: Mexico City, Mexico

Group C
Venue: Valdivia, Chile

Group D
Venue: Ponce, Puerto Rico

Semifinal phase
The eight teams which advance from the group phase, played in this stage in which each team faced the other teams in the group once. Each group tournament was held at the arena of a host team. The two highest-placed teams in each group advance to the final four. Games were played from 8 March until 17 March 2019.

Group E
Venue: Franca, Brazil

Group F
Venue: Buenos Aires, Argentina

Final Four
The final four tournament decided the champion of the 2019 season. The tournament was held from 30 March and 31 March 2019 in the Polideportivo Roberto Pando in Buenos Aires, Argentina.

References

2019
2018–19 in South American basketball
2018–19 in North American basketball
2019 in basketball